Ailby is a hamlet in the East Lindsey district of Lincolnshire, England. The village does not possess a place name sign, and its only service is a small garden centre and a livery yard.

The ecclesiastical parish is Rigsby with Ailsby, part of the Alford Group of the Deanery of Calcewaithe & Candleshoe.   The parish church is St James at Rigsby.

DMV
The village is mentioned in the 1086 Domesday Book as "Halebi", consisting of 8 households.

The hamlet appears to be the Deserted Medieval Village of Ailby, located to the south of the present Ailby Hall Farm.

References

External links 
 
 

Hamlets in Lincolnshire
East Lindsey District